Tate Aaron Smith  (born 19 November 1981) is an Australian sprint canoeist who competed in the late 2000s. At the 2008 Summer Olympics in Beijing, he was eliminated in the semifinals of the K-4 1000 m event.

At the 2012 Summer Olympics, he was part of the Australian K-4 team that won the gold medal.

In July 2014 Smith tested positive for the banned substance Stanozolol, receiving a two-year ban.

References

Sports-Reference.com profile

1981 births
Australian male canoeists
Canoeists at the 2008 Summer Olympics
Canoeists at the 2012 Summer Olympics
Living people
Olympic canoeists of Australia
Olympic gold medalists for Australia
Olympic medalists in canoeing
ICF Canoe Sprint World Championships medalists in kayak
Medalists at the 2012 Summer Olympics
Doping cases in canoeing
Doping cases in Australian canoeing
Recipients of the Medal of the Order of Australia
21st-century Australian people